Softdrive Records (formerly known as Lavish Records) was an independent record label. Softdrive Records was founded by Stone Temple Pilots/ex-Velvet Revolver singer Scott Weiland in 2006. The now-defunct band The Actual was the first band to be signed to the label. Weiland's second solo album, "Happy" in Galoshes, was released on Softdrive Records on November 25, 2008. Weiland's last endeavor with Softdrive was to produce and release the Vox Waves in 2015; the band never released the album due to circumstances surrounding Weiland's Death.

Roster
The Actual (until 2007)
Something to Burn
Scott Weiland (solo)
The Color Turning
Tommy Joe Wilson
Vox Waves (Unreleased)

See also
List of record labels

References

External links

American independent record labels
Scott Weiland